Polymastia pepo is a species of sea sponge belonging to the family Polymastiidae. It is a common species of rocky subtidal and intertidal habitats in the far north of North Island, New Zealand.

This is a large, often spherical sponge up to 40 cm in diameter. It is firm and bright orange and rather resembles a pumpkin (hence the specific name: "pepo" is Latin for "pumpkin").

References

pepo
Sponges of New Zealand
Animals described in 1997
Taxa named by Patricia Bergquist
Taxa named by Michelle Kelly (marine scientist)